Apache Skies is a four-issue comic book limited series, published in 2002 by Marvel Comics as a part of that company's MAX imprint. The series was written by John Ostrander and drawn by Leonardo Manco.

The series was a sequel to 2000s Blaze of Glory.

Plot summary
After the death of the Apache Kid, the Rawhide Kid joins forces with the new Apache Kid to find the killer.

Collected editions
It was published in a collected trade paperback as Apache Skies in 2002.

Notes

References

 
 

Comics by John Ostrander